Esoteric information refers to esotericism, the hidden meanings and symbolism of various philosophical, historical, and religious texts, in contrast to exoteric (visible, external) information. 

Esoteric may also refer to:
 Esoteric (band), a British doom metal band
 The Esoteric, an American hardcore/rock band
 Esoteric (album), a 2009 album by Skyfire
 Esoteric (rapper) (born 1978), American rapper
 Esoteric Recordings, a record label
 The Esoterics (ensemble), a vocal ensemble from Seattle
 Al Haig Trio (Esoteric), a 1954 album known as Esoteric when reissued
 Esoteric programming language
Esoteric, an object classification in the SCP Foundation storytelling project

Esoterica may also refer to:
 Esoterica (medication), a brand of skin cream
 Esoterica (band), a British alternative rock band

See also
 7L & Esoteric, a hip hop music group from Boston
 ESO (disambiguation)